Notoplax aupouria is a very rare species of chiton in the family Acanthochitonidae.

References
 Powell A. W. B., New Zealand Mollusca, William Collins Publishers Ltd, Auckland, New Zealand 1979 

aupouria
Chitons of New Zealand
Molluscs described in 1937
Taxa named by Arthur William Baden Powell
Endemic fauna of New Zealand
Endemic molluscs of New Zealand